Lela Lee (born in Los Angeles, California) is an American actress and cartoonist, television writer, and the creator of the animated cartoon Angry Little Asian Girl and the related comic strip Angry Little Girls.

Career

Acting career 
She is a film and television actress, with roles in the 1998 film Yellow and the 2002 film Better Luck Tomorrow. She was a series regular in the short-lived Sci Fi Channel series Tremors, and had a recurring guest role on NBC's Scrubs. Lee made a guest appearance in the first episode of Season Four of HBO's Curb Your Enthusiasm, playing an angry Asian woman, who launches a physical and verbal attack on star Larry David after he suggests Tang is a common Chinese name. Lee was also in the episode "Animal Pragmatism" of Charmed as Tessa, a college student.

Angry Little Girls and Angry Little Asian Girl 

Angry Little Girls was developed by Kim, the "Angry Little Asian Girl", a character she developed in 1994 when she was a sophomore at UC Berkeley. She developed the character after attending Spike and Mike's Sick and Twisted Festival of Animation with a friend. That night, Lee stayed up drawing with typing paper and Crayola markers, and a video camera and made the first episode "Angry Little Asian Girl, the First Day of School." Three years after creating the first episode of the Angry Little Asian Girl, she created four more, and sent the five episodes titled Angry Little Asian Girl, Five Angry Episodes to festivals where they were well-reviewed by critics of the LA Times and LA Weekly. These episodes, like the first, use foul language and shocking imagery to bring attention to issues surrounding the intersection of being Asian and a woman.  Audience members came up to her after screenings saying that ALAG spoke for them and that they too had similar experiences growing up in America. Lee then made a batch of T-shirts based on the show, which sold out by word of mouth, prompting her to launch a shop on the website www.angrylittleasiangirl.com in late 1997.

Lee expanded ALAG to include other girls of different backgrounds and personalities. She took two years to teach herself how to draw comics with books checked out from the library. With the newly created characters, and an umbrella name of "Angry Little Girls" Lee turned her work into a weekly comic strip self-published on her website www.angrylittlegirls.com. Lee added characters of diverse ethnicities and backgrounds to increase her strip's public and commercial appeal. In 2005, the first book of collected Angry Little Girls strips was published by Harry N. Abrams. Following this, several other themed collections of Lee's comics were published by the publisher's imprint, Abrams Comic Arts. By 2007, Angry Little Girls merchandise were selling in malls across the US. Lee has six Angry Little Girls books published. 2014 marked the 20-year anniversary of ALAG's creation. In December 2014, Angry Little Asian Girl had a short run on a cable network and is now a web series.

Filmography

Television

Film

Personal life
 
Lee, the youngest of four daughters, spent her earliest years being raised on a chicken farm by her grandparents in Korea.  A few years later, she joined her family in Van Nuys before they moved to San Dimas, and she cites her traditional Korean upbringing while growing up in an area with few other Asian Americans as a central influence in her work. She is married and has two sons.

Writing credits
Angry Little Asian Girl (2014) – creator, writer, executive producer.
The First Day of School (2014) – writer
Dinner Party (2014) – writer
Kim's Date (2014) – writer
Mother Lee's Etiquette (2014) – writer
Sistahood (2014) – writer
Deborah's Diet (2014) – writer
Occupy Placentia (2014) – writer
Chuy, the Undocumented Chicken (2014) – writer
Kim's Twinkie Defense (2014) – writer
Fast Food Rude (2014) – writer
Xyla's Therapy (2014) – writer
Anger Management (2014) – writer

Bibliography 

 Angry Little Girls (2005) 
 Still Angry Little Girls (2006) 
 Angry Little Girls in Love (2008) 
 Angry Little Girls: A Little Book of Love (2008) 
 Fairy Tales for Angry Little Girls (2011) 
 Angry Little Girls: A Little Kit for Friends (2013)

References

External links

 Angry Little Girls
 Angry Little Asian Girl
 Lela Lee
1998 Angry Little Asian Girl Review LA Times
 1998 Interview with AsianWeek
 2001 IndieRag Interview
 2001 Washington Post "Comic Strip of a Different Stripe"
 2003 Interview with UCLA's Asian Institute
 2003 Seattle Times 'Little Girls' presents big ideas without forgetting angry origins"
 2004 Interview on PBS's Searching for Asian America
 2004 Cincinnati Enquirer "Angry Girl bags carry an attitude"
 2004 Sacramento Bee "Mad World"
 2004 Move over, Hello Kitty: New characters are taking over the kingdom of cute"
 2008 Lela Lee LA Weekly
 2013 LA Times "Angry Little Asian Girl is sharing her feelings"
 
 YouTube Angry Little Asian Girl

20th-century American actresses
21st-century American actresses
Living people
Animators from California
Actresses from Los Angeles
American comic strip cartoonists
People from San Dimas, California
American film actresses
American television actresses
American actresses of Korean descent
American women animators
American female comics artists
Year of birth missing (living people)